Jafarabad (also Romanized as Ja‘farābād; also known as Ja‘farābād-e Mīsh Khāş) is a village in the Sivan District of Ilam County, Ilam Province, Iran. At the 2006 census, its population was 2,092, in 435 families. The village became the capital of Sivan District which was established on March 9, 2013.

The village is populated by Kurds.

References 

Populated places in Ilam County

Kurdish settlements in Ilam Province